Stransky, Stránský or Stranski (Bulgarian: Странски) is a Slavic masculine surname, its feminine counterpart is Stranska or Stránská. It may refer to:
 Georgi Stranski (1847–1904), Bulgarian physician and politician
 Ivan Stranski (1897–1979), Bulgarian physical chemist
 Jan Stránský (born 1990), Czech ice hockey player
 Jaroslav Stránský, Czech ice hockey player
 Jiří Stránský (1931–2019), Czech author, playwright, and translator
 Joel Stransky (born 1967), South African rugby union rugby player
 Josef Stránský (1872–1936), Czech conductor, composer, and art collector
 Mara Stransky (born 1999), Australian sailor
 Matěj Stránský, Czech ice hockey player
 Richard Stránsky (born 1991), Slovak football goalkeeper
 Tanner Stransky, American journalist and television critic
 Vladan Stransky (born 1973), Australian ice hockey player

Bulgarian-language surnames
Czech-language surnames